Al-Jamahir Sport Club, is an Iraqi football team based in Karbala, that plays in Iraq Division Three.

History
Al-Jamahir Sports Club was established in 1973, the team played for the first time in the Iraqi Premier League at the 1988–89 season in the Central Group, and did not achieve good results, so they relegated to Iraq Division One at the end of the season.

Famous players
Sahib Abbas

Honours

Friendly
Central Euphrates Football Championship
Winners (1): 2019

See also
 2020–21 Iraq FA Cup

References

External links
 Al-Jamahir SC at Goalzz.com

1973 establishments in Iraq
Association football clubs established in 1973
Football clubs in Karbala
Karbala